Joseph Edward Davies (November 29, 1876 – May 9, 1958) was an American lawyer and diplomat.  He was appointed by President Wilson to be Commissioner of Corporations in 1912, and  First Chairman of the Federal Trade Commission in 1915.  He was the second Ambassador to represent the United States in the Soviet Union and U.S. Ambassador to Belgium and Luxembourg. From 1939 to 1941 Davies was Special assistant to Secretary of State Hull, in charge of War Emergency Problems and Policies.   From 1942 through 1946 he was Chairman of President Roosevelt's War Relief Control Board. Ambassador Davies was Special Advisor of President Harry Truman and Secretary of State James F. Byrnes with rank of Ambassador at the Potsdam Conference in 1945.

Early life

Davies was born in Watertown, Wisconsin to Welsh-born parents Edward and Rachel (Paynter) Davies. He attended the University of Wisconsin Law School from 1898 to 1901, where he graduated with honors. Upon graduation, he returned to Watertown and began a private practice. He served as a delegate to the Wisconsin Democratic Convention in 1902. He moved to Madison in 1907, and became chairman of the Democratic Party of Wisconsin.

Davies played an important role in ensuring that the western states and Wisconsin gave Woodrow Wilson their vote at the 1912 Democratic National Convention. Wilson made Davies head of his entire western campaign. As a reward for being critical in winning Wilson the election, Wilson named Davies head of the Bureau of Corporations. Davies was instrumental in the formation of the Bureau's successor organization, the Federal Trade Commission, and served as its first chairman from 1915 to 1916. At  the President's request when Senator Paul O. Husting of Wisconsin suddenly died in 1917, Davies retired from the FTC in order to run for the open seat in a special election. He lost to Republican Irvine Lenroot in a pivotal election which denied Democrats control of the U.S. Senate. President Wilson appointed Davies to serve as an economic advisor to the United States during the Paris Peace Conference following World War I.

After the electoral loss, Davies went into private legal practice in Washington D.C. In 1933 Rafael Trujillo of the Dominican Republic engaged Davies to work for him when he tried to settle his country's debt.

Davies’ most famous law case was when he defended former Ford Motor Company stockholders against a $30,000,000 suit the US Treasury Department brought against them for back taxes. Davies proved his clients did not owe the government anything but that his clients were to receive a $3,600,000 refund. The case—which took three years to litigate (from 1924 to 1927)—brought him the largest fee in the history of the D.C. bar, $2,000,000.

Davies represented politicians, labor leaders and minority groups but his specialty was as an antitrust attorney. His corporate clients included Seagrams, National Dairy, Copley Publishing, Anglo-Swiss, Nestle, Fox Films and many others. In 1937 his law firm was: Davies, Richberg, Beebe, Busick and Richardson, in DC.

In 1901 Davies married Mary Emlen Knight, daughter of Civil War Colonel John Henry Knight, a leading conservative Democrat and business associate of William Freeman Vilas and Jay Cooke. He had a daughter with her named Eleanor Tydings Ditzen. They were divorced in 1935. His second wife was General Foods heiress Marjorie Merriweather Post, whom he married in 1935; the couple divorced in 1955.

Ambassador to the Soviet Union
Davies was appointed Ambassador to the Soviet Union by Franklin D. Roosevelt and served from 1936 to 1938. His appointment was made in part based on his skills as a corporate lawyer (Chairman, FTC), and international lawyer, his longtime friendship with FDR since the Woodrow Wilson days and for his political loyalty to Roosevelt.

Davies had been asked by FDR to evaluate the strength of the Soviet Army, its government and its industry and to find out if possible which side the Russians would be on in the "coming war."
 
While Davies' predecessor, William Christian Bullitt, Jr. had been an admirer of the Soviet Union who gradually came to loathe Stalin's brutality and repression, Davies remained unaffected  by reports of the disappearance of thousands of Russians and foreigners in the Soviet Union throughout his stay as U.S. Ambassador. His reports from the Soviet Union were pragmatic, optimistic, and usually devoid of criticism of Stalin and his policies. While he briefly noted the USSR's 'authoritarian' form of government, Davies praised the nation's boundless natural resources and the contentment of Soviet workers while 'building socialism'. He went on numerous tours of the country, carefully prearranged by Soviet officials. In one of his final memos from Moscow to Washington D.C., Davies assessed:

Communism holds no serious threat to the United States. Friendly relations in the future may be of great general value.

Davies attended the Trial of the Twenty One, one of the Stalinist purge trials of the late 1930s. He was convinced of the guilt of the accused. According to Davies, "the Kremlin's fears [regarding treason in the Army and Party] were well justified".  His opinions were at odds with much of the Western press of the day, as well as those of his own staff, many of whom had been in the country far longer than Davies.  The career diplomat Charles Bohlen, who served under Davies in Moscow, later wrote:

Davies even claimed that communism was "protecting the Christian world of free men", and he urged all Christians "by the faith you have found at your mother's knee, in the name of the faith you have found in temples of worship" to embrace the Soviet Union.

After Moscow, Davies was assigned to the post of Ambassador in Belgium (1938–1939) and Minister to Luxembourg concurrently before being recalled to the United States following the declaration of war in 1939. Davies served as a special assistant to Secretary of State Cordell Hull.

Mission to Moscow
Davies' work in the Soviet Union resulted in his popular book, Mission to Moscow.  The book—published by Simon & Schuster in 1941 which sold close to 700,000 copies worldwide in many languages—consists of letters, diary entries, and Davies' State Department reports between 1936 and 1938, which Roosevelt agreed for Davies to use.

In 1943, the book was adapted as a Warner Brothers movie starring Walter Huston as Davies and Ann Harding as his wife Marjorie Post Davies. As part of his book contract, Davies retained absolute control of the script, and his rejection of the original script caused Warner Brothers to hire a new screenwriter, Howard Koch, to rewrite the script in order to gain Davies' approval. The movie, made during World War II, showed the Soviet Union under Joseph Stalin in a positive light. Completed in late April 1943, the film was, in the words of Robert Buckner, the film's producer, "an expedient lie for political purposes, glossily covering up important facts with full or partial knowledge of their false presentation.

I did not fully respect Mr. Davies' integrity, both before, during and after the film.  I knew that FDR had brainwashed him ...

The movie gave a one-sided view of the Moscow trials, rationalized Moscow's participation in the Nazi-Soviet Pact and its unprovoked invasion of Finland, and portrayed the Soviet Union as a  state that was moving towards a democratic model, a Soviet Union committed to internationalism. As did the book, the final screenplay portrayed the defendants in the Moscow trials as guilty in Davies's view. It also portrayed some of the purges as an attempt by Stalin to rid his country of pro-German fifth columnists.

Second Mission to Moscow

In May 1943 Roosevelt sent Davies on a second mission to Moscow.  He was gone 27 days and traveled 25,779 miles, carrying a secret letter from the President to Stalin.  Because of the war raging in Europe, Davies could not fly over Europe, and so flew from New York to Brazil, to Dakar; Luxor, Egypt; Baghdad, Iraq; Teheran, Iran; Kuibyshev, Russia; Stalingrad, Russia and on to Moscow.  He returned to the States via Novosibirsk and Alaska.

FDR wanted to discuss matters with Stalin—one on one—and felt that setting up such a meeting could be done more easily through a mutual and trusted friend—Davies. In the letter, FDR asked for a visit between himself and Stalin where they could talk over matters without restraint. It would only include an interpreter and stenographer.  Prime Minister Churchill and Foreign Minister Eden had often met with Stalin and Molotov. FDR and Secretary Hull had not. Stalin agreed to a meeting in Fairbanks, Alaska on July 15 or August 15. He asked that Davies stress to FDR that Hitler was massing his armies for an all-out drive and that they needed more of everything through Lend-Lease.

Davies was surprised to find much the same hostility and what he regarded as prejudice in the U.S. diplomatic corps in Moscow toward the Russians as when he was there in 1937–1938.  He complained to them that public criticism of America's Soviet ally might be harmful to the war effort.

Postwar career
Following World War II, the Davies took up residence at Tregaron in Washington, D.C. (named after the village in Wales where Davies' father was born) , where they entertained extensively.

In 1945 Davies was made Special Envoy of President Harry Truman, with rank of Ambassador, to confer with Prime Minister Churchill, and Special Advisor of President Truman and Secretary of State James F. Byrnes, with rank of Ambassador, at the Potsdam Conference. His papers from this period deposited in the Library of Congress were long classified documents.

Davies was divorced by his wife Marjorie in 1955. She sold her yacht, the Sea Cloud, to the longtime dictator of the Dominican Republic, Rafael Trujillo. Davies continued to live at Tregaron until his death from a cerebral hemorrhage on May 9, 1958.

Ambassador Davies' ashes are buried in the crypt at the National Cathedral, in Washington, DC. He gave both the  baptistery stained glass window to the Cathedral in honor of his mother, Rachel Davies (Rahel o Fôn), as well as his collection of Russian icons and chalices for their newly formed museum—created by the Dean of the cathedral, Frank Sayre (Woodrow Wilson's grandson).  These rare articles were sold at auction by Sotheby's in 1976 after Davies' death to cover the cathedral's debt.

Honors
 United States – Medal for Merit, 1946
 Soviet Union – Order of Lenin
 France – Grand Cross of the Legion of Honor, May 1950
 Belgium – Grand Cordon de l'Ordre de Léopold, Feb 1940
Awards from the governments of Luxembourg; Greece; Yugoslavia; the Dominican Republic; Peru; Panama; and Mexico.
Joseph E. Davies's coat of arms granted in 1939 by the College of Arms is used as a logo by the Trump Organization.

References

Further reading
Davis, G. Cullom. "The Transformation of the Federal Trade Commission, 1914–1929," The Mississippi Valley Historical Review, (1962), 49#3 pp. 437–455 in JSTOR
Dunn, Dennis Caught between Roosevelt and Stalin: America's Ambassadors to Moscow, University Press of Kentucky, 1997, 
Maclean, Elizabeth Kimball, Joseph E. Davies: Envoy To The Soviets, Praeger Publishers, 1993, 
MacLean, Elizabeth Kimball. "Joseph E. Davies: The Wisconsin Idea and the Origins of the Federal Trade Commission," Journal of the Gilded Age and Progressive Era (2007) 6#3 pp. 248–284.

Primary sources
Davies, Joseph Edward, Mission to Moscow, Simon & Schuster, 1941.
Department of Commerce – Bureau of Corporations, "TRUST LAWS AND UNFAIR COMPETITION" – Joseph E. Davies, Commissioner of Corporations – March 15, 1915 (832 page tome )
Library of Congress:  Joseph Edward Davies Papers 
Yergin, Daniel, "Shattered Peace:  The Origins of the Cold War and the National Security State",  Houghton Mifflin Company, 1977.
Catalogue of the Joseph E. Davies Collection of Russian Paintings and Icons Presented to The University of Wisconsin; Catalogue issued by the Alumni Association of the University of Wisconsin of the City of New York, 1938

External links

United States Embassy, Russia. US Ministers and Ambassadors to Russia
Political Graveyard Web Site
Mission to Moscow (AMC Network)

Joe Davies Foundation 
Joseph E. Davies Collection – Chazen Museum of Art University of Wisconsin, Madison 
 

People from Watertown, Wisconsin
University of Wisconsin Law School alumni
1876 births
1958 deaths
Federal Trade Commission personnel
Ambassadors of the United States to the Soviet Union
20th-century American diplomats
Ambassadors of the United States to Belgium
Ambassadors of the United States to Luxembourg
American people of Welsh descent
Burials at Washington National Cathedral
Wisconsin Democrats
Woodrow Wilson administration personnel